Later On  is the third studio album by American singer-songwriter Jandek, and the second released by Corwood Industries (#0741) in 1981. It was reissued on CD in 2000.

As with the prior Six and Six (and most of Ready for the House), this is a stark acoustic and vocals album with roots in Delta blues. Unlike the first two, however, the pace is picked up a bit, and there are other musicians present, or the harmonica appearing for the first time may be overdubbed.

The song "The Janitor" would receive a sequel eight years later on the album The Living End with the song "Janitor's Dead."

Track listing

External links
Seth Tisue's Later On review

Jandek albums
Corwood Industries albums
1981 albums